SK Baťov 1930 is a Czech football club located in Otrokovice in the Zlín Region. The club currently plays at the fifth level of football in the Czech Republic.

The club played in the Czechoslovak First League, the top flight of Czechoslovak football, in the 1964–65 season under the name of Jiskra Otrokovice.

Historical names
 1930: SK Otrokovice
 1935: SK Baťov
 1948: ZK Botostroj Baťov
 1948: Sokol Svit Otrokovice
 1953: Jiskra Otrokovice
 2009: SK Baťov 1930

References

External links
 Official website 

Football clubs in the Czech Republic
Association football clubs established in 1930
Czechoslovak First League clubs
Zlín Region